Marshalltown is an unincorporated community located within Mannington Township, in Salem County, New Jersey. It has also been known as Frogtown.

History
Located near the Salem River, Marshalltown was one of five pre-Civil War communities developed along tributaries of the Delaware River by freedmen. It is named after Thomas Marshall (1803–1856), who purchased land here starting in 1834.

Before the abolition of slavery, these black-populated communities offered protection and aid to fugitive slaves, and "the likelihood that there was antebellum Underground Railroad activity is high".

The settlement once contained many houses and gardens, a school, stores, and two churches.  Mount Zion A.U.M.P. Church in Marshalltown is one of the earliest African Methodist churches.

By 2010, only a school house, a church, and two cemeteries survived, and "isolation, theft, vandalism, and lack of historic preservation planning threaten the surviving cultural landscape of Marshalltown".

Historic district

The Marshalltown Historic District is a  historic district encompassing the community. It was added to the National Register of Historic Places on July 17, 2013, for its significance in architecture, ethnic heritage - Black, community development, landscape architecture, religion, and social history from 1834 to 1951. The district includes 7 contributing buildings and 33 contributing sites.

See also
 National Register of Historic Places listings in Salem County, New Jersey

References

Mannington Township, New Jersey
Populated places established by African Americans
Unincorporated communities in Salem County, New Jersey
Unincorporated communities in New Jersey
African-American history of New Jersey
A.U.M.P. Church